Hawsh Nasri (also spelled Hosh Nasri)  is a Syrian village located in Markaz Rif Dimashq, Rif Dimashq to the northwest of the Al-Nashabiyah nahiyah ("subdistrict"). According to the Syria Central Bureau of Statistics (CBS), Hawsh Nasri had a population of 2,459 in the 2004 census.

References 

Populated places in Douma District
Populated places in Markaz Rif Dimashq District